Nina Puikkonen Mortensen (born August 3, 1979) was an American indoor volleyball player.

She played for the United States women's national volleyball team, at the 2002 FIVB World Grand Prix.

Life
Puikkonen was a three-time All-American for Brigham Young University.
She played for the Chicago Thunder, and Tarmo-Volley.
In 2013, she was an assistant coach at Utah Valley State College.

References

External links

1979 births
Living people
American women's volleyball players
BYU Cougars women's volleyball players
Middle blockers